KTSS-LP was a low-powered community television station broadcasting from Hope, Arkansas on channel 50. The station was viewable throughout much of southwestern Arkansas with an over-the-air digital broadcast antenna and was also available on local cable television providers throughout the region. The channel aired a wide variety of local shows which it produced, as well as paid religious programming and infomercials.

KTSS-LP also occasionally served as a secondary Ion Television affiliate for the area.

The station was founded in 1994 by Kevin McKinnon and the non-profit group Christian Community Television (CCT). McKinnon and Sandra May purchased the station's assets in 1998 to operate the station commercially as Hope Television, Inc. McKinnon and May sold KTSS-LP to Greg Bobo and Joyce Bobo (Artex TV, LLC) in 2002. The station closed permanently in March 2017. From 2001 to 2005, KTSS-LP aired rebroadcasts of NBC affiliate KTAL-TV's 6 P.M. and 10 P.M. newscasts with the newscast being replayed on KTSS-LP at 6:30 P.M. and 10:30 P.M.

KTSS-LP's license was cancelled by the Federal Communications Commission on June 8, 2021 for failure to file a license renewal application.

External links

TSS-LP
Television channels and stations established in 1995
1995 establishments in Arkansas
Defunct television stations in the United States
Television channels and stations disestablished in 2021
2021 disestablishments in Arkansas
TSS-LP